Wood Green School is a coeducational secondary school and sixth form located in Oxfordshire, England, which serves the traditional blanket making and historic town of Witney and its surrounding villages.

History 
The school was established in 1953 as Witney's secondary modern school before becoming a comprehensive school in 1968. In 2016 the school completed the building of a new Sixth Form Centre, school restaurant and drama studio.

Previously a community school administered by Oxfordshire County Council, in February 2017 Wood Green School converted to academy status. The school is now sponsored by the Acer Trust.

Facilities 
Set in over thirty acres of grounds and playing fields, the school is equipped with an all-weather floodlit pitch, multi-purpose sports hall, gymnasium and fitness suite. All classrooms throughout the school are equipped with projectors and/or interactive whiteboards. In 2015 Wood Green School was inspected by Ofsted and judged to be Good.

Academics 
Wood Green School hosts approximately 1100 students, aged between 11–19, including the Sixth form.
 
The school is a specialist visual and performing Arts College with many extra curricular activities in drama 

In 2015, 68% of GCSE candidates achieved 5 or more A*-C grades, and 54% of GCSE candidates achieved 5 or more A*-C grades including English and Mathematics. In 2015 at A Level, 80% of grades achieved were A*-C.

Sixth form
The majority of students choose to continue their studies at the school's Sixth form. The Sixth Form Centre is located in a modern building above the school restaurant, with a panoramic view over the school grounds. It includes a common room, seminar room, as well as a silent study workroom with networked computers and printing facilities. The Sixth form is part of the Witney Consortium, offering a wider range of course choices by allowing students to study some of their subjects at Henry Box School.

Notable former pupils
Emma Appleton - Actress and model (Traitors, The Witcher).

References

External links
 Wood Green School's website

Secondary schools in Oxfordshire
Educational institutions established in 1953
1953 establishments in England
Academies in Oxfordshire
Witney